Maynard's House is a horror novel by Herman Raucher. The book is the story of a young Vietnam War veteran, Austin, suffering from posttraumatic stress disorder who learns that his best friend, the eponymous Maynard, has been killed in combat; in his will, Maynard leaves the narrator his house, a historical site in which a woman accused of witchcraft was killed around the time of the Salem Witch Trials. Austin moves into the house, and shortly thereafter is trapped when an unexpectedly strong winter storm sweeps in. Isolated in the home, the narrator begins to try to come to terms with the trauma of the things he witnessed in combat, and grows increasingly paranoid that the home might be haunted by the murdered witch.

The themes of a man troubled by his inheritance of something belonging to a dead soldier, and of a man's best friend being killed in war, are ones that run in many of Herman Raucher's works, and are implicitly tied to traumatic events in his own life: He lost his virginity to a traumatized war widow, and his best friend, an army medic, was killed in combat in the Korean War on Raucher's birthday.

References
Herman Raucher. Maynard's House. Berkley Publishing Group, Aug 1, 1981

1981 American novels
American horror novels
G. P. Putnam's Sons books